The A∴A∴ is a magical organization described in 1907 by occultist Aleister Crowley. Its members are dedicated to the advancement of humanity by perfection of the individual on every plane through a graded series of universal initiations. Its initiations are syncretic, unifying the essence of Theravada Buddhism with Vedantic yoga and ceremonial magic. The A∴A∴ applies what it describes as mystical and magical methods of spiritual attainment under the structure of the Qabalistic Tree of Life, and aims to research, practise, and teach "scientific illuminism". A∴A∴ is often held to stand for Argenteum Astrum, which is Latin for Silver Star, however, see section on Name below.

History
The A∴A∴ claims to have been present in all societies and epochs, although not necessarily under that name.

The A∴A∴ is composed of two orders, known as the inner and outer college. The outer college in its modern form was formulated in 1907 by Aleister Crowley and George Cecil Jones, claiming authority from Aiwass (the Author of The Book of the Law) and other Secret Chiefs of the planetary spiritual order after the schism in and subsequent collapse of the Hermetic Order of the Golden Dawn at the turn of the Twentieth century. The principal holy book of the A∴A∴ is the book Crowley called AL and Liber Legis, technically called Liber AL vel Legis sub figura CCXX as delivered by 93=418 to DCLXVI, whose scriptural title is The Book of the Law, by which name the Book is most commonly known and referred to. There are several other holy books venerated in A∴A∴, which comprise the so-called Class A and AB material.

In 1919 the O.T.O. considered itself to be a "close ally" of the A∴A∴, both organisations having accepted the authority of The Book of the Law, although the O.T.O., being a temporal and fraternal society, in no way participates in the A∴A∴'s strictly hierarchic and spiritual initiatory program, nor does O.T.O. represent A∴A∴. or transmit its functions or authority.

The classic account of A∴A∴ is Karl Von Eckharthausen's The Cloud Upon the Sanctuary, re-issued by the A∴A∴ as Liber XXXIII.

After Crowley

Following Crowley's death in 1947, his student Karl Germer took over running the outer college of the order, but since Germer's death the situation has been less clear. Various lineages of the A∴A∴ survive today that claim to be descended from Crowley.

One such lineage descends from Crowley's student, actress Jane Wolfe (known as Soror Estai). Soror Estai's one student, Phyllis Seckler (Soror Meral), founded College of Thelema in 1973 and (with James A. Eshelman and Anna-Kria King) founded Temple of Thelema in 1987. She designated Eshelman as her successor in the Jane Wolfe branch of A∴A∴ and as chancellor of College of Thelema. Later, she also affirmed David Shoemaker's authority to "admit, supervise, and train" A∴A∴ initiates.

Several lineages run through pupils of Marcelo Ramos Motta, such that of J. Daniel  Gunther. Another lineage links itself to Crowley through Israel Regardie and his pupil Gerald Suster. Other lineages run through Grady McMurtry and Charles Stansfeld Jones.

Name

Membership

Members of the First Order of A∴A∴ (Golden Dawn) and Dominus Liminis are sworn to openly declare everywhere their connection with A∴A∴ (Liber CLXXXV). Adepts, however, are expected to work in silence, whereas Magi are required to declare "their Law". The Ipsissimi, who "existeth without form", the highest initiates manifest on this plane, are sworn to silence as to their attainment to this degree (Liber B vel Magi, One Star in Sight).

In A∴A∴ members officially only know those directly above and below in the chain of instruction. Members are expected to work alone, consulting as needed with their superior in the Order. In this way the founders of the system hoped to avoid the many political problems that allegedly brought about the downfall of the predecessor organisation, the Hermetic Order of the Golden Dawn. The A∴A∴ is an organisation focused on enlightenment of the individual, with a strong emphasis on maintaining the chain of initiation from teacher to student, and devoting all of one's attainments to those individuals below them (One Star in Sight).

All members of the A∴A∴ at some point, are expected to perform two central tasks:
 The Task of the grade of Adeptus Minor, the first grade of the Middle Order, being the attainment of the experience known as "the Knowledge and Conversation of the Holy Guardian Angel, the attainment of which is the central theme of the order's official instructions
 The experience of the passage through the  Abyss, resulting in the attainment of the grade of Magister Templi, the first grade in the Third Order

Any person whosoever may swear the Oath of the Master of the Temple of A∴A∴ and be admitted into the Opening of the Grade of Magister Templi and the Order of the S∴S∴ the opening of which is the passage through the Abyss.

It is the strict and inviolable rule of the Order that members of A∴A∴ never accept payment or other consideration for initiation or other services, on pain of irredeemable expulsion.

Initiatory structure

The initiatory structure of A∴A∴ is based on the Qabalistic Tree Of Life, its grades following the sephirot up the tree in reverse order. 
The A∴A∴ is sub-divided into three orders:
The S.S., being the governing body (Third Order) and comprising those grades that are above the Abyss;
The R.R. et A.C. (Second Order), comprising those degrees that are below the Abyss but above the Veil of Paroketh; and
The Golden Dawn (First Order), comprising the grades below the Veil of Paroketh. A complete description of the tasks of the First Order is given in Liber XIII vel Graduum Montis Abiegni: a syllabus of the steps upon path, in The Equinox Volume 1.

Two additional "grades", the Dwellers on the Thresholds, link the orders: Dominus Limnis in Paroketh, and Babe of the Abyss in the Abyss.

Members of the Third Order can generate their own variations of the First and Second Order teachings as reflections of their own Understanding, contemplating systems of attainment not compassed in the curriculum of the main system.

Student

A student's business is to acquire a general intellectual knowledge of all systems of attainment, as declared in the prescribed books. At the end of a fixed period, the Student takes a written examination to test his reading, after which he passes through a small ritual involving the reading of the History Lection (Liber LXI), and passes to the grade of Probationer.

The Order of the G∴D∴ (Golden Dawn)

Probationer
(0°=0□): The Probationer's principal business is to begin such practices as he or she may prefer, and to write a careful record of the same for at least one year.

Neophyte
(1°=10□): Has to acquire perfect control of the astral plane.

Zelator
(2°=9□): The Zelator's main work is to achieve complete success in asana and pranayama. The Zelator also begins to study the formula of the Rose Cross.

Practicus
(3°=8□): Is expected to complete the intellectual training, and in particular to study Qabalah.

Philosophus
(4°=7□): Is expected to complete the moral training. Is tested in Devotion to the Order.

Dominus Liminis
(The Link): Is expected to show mastery of pratyahara and dharana.

The Order of the R∴C∴ (Rosy Cross)

Adeptus Minor (Without)

(5°=6□): Lesser Adept (Without). Is expected to perform the Great Work and to attain the Knowledge and Conversation of the Holy Guardian Angel. In the system of the A∴A∴ magical order, the single most important goal is to consciously connect with one’s HGA and, by doing so, the magician becomes fully aware of their own True Will. For Crowley, this event was the single most important goal of any adept:

Adeptus Minor (Within)
(5°=6□): Lesser Adept (Within). Is admitted to the practice of the formula of the Rosy Cross on entering the College of the Holy Ghost.

Adeptus Major
(6°=5□): Greater Adept. Obtains a general mastery of practical Magick, though without comprehension.

Adeptus Exemptus

(7°=4□): Exempt Adept. After one attains Knowledge and Conversation with the Holy Guardian Angel and completes in perfection all these matters, the adept may attempt the crossing of the Abyss, the great gulf or void between the phenomenal world of manifestation and its noumenal source, that great spiritual wilderness which must be crossed by the adept to attain mastery. Choronzon is the Dweller in the Abyss; he is there as the final obstruction. If he is met with the proper preparation, then he is there to destroy the ego, which allows the adept to move beyond the Abyss. If unprepared, then the unfortunate traveller will be utterly dispersed into annihilation, leaving the adept to become a Brother of the Left Hand Path. If successful, the adept stripped of all their attainments and of their self as well, even of their Holy Guardian Angel, and becoming a Babe of the Abyss, who, having transcended the Reason, does nothing but grow in the womb of its mother, Babalon.

The Order of the S∴S∴ (Silver Star)

Magister Templi

(8°=3□): Babalon is on the other side of the Abyss (beckoning in the sphere of Binah on the Tree of Life). If the adept gives himself to her—the symbol of this act is the pouring of the adept’s blood into her graal—he becomes impregnated in her (a state called "Babe of the Abyss"), then he is reborn as a Master and a Saint that dwells in the City of the Pyramids, becoming a Master of the Temple. The principal business of this grade is to obtain a perfect understanding of the Universe. The Magister Templi is pre-eminently the Master of Mysticism, that is, his Understanding is entirely free from internal contradiction or external obscurity; his Work is to comprehend the existing Universe in accordance with his own Mind. This grade corresponds to Binah on the Tree of Life. Crowley also linked it with the experience he called "Shivadarshana" and with the Four Formless States of Buddhism, although he cautions against treating these criteria as sufficient for the grade.

The City of the Pyramids is the home to those adepts that have crossed the great Abyss, having spilled all their blood in the Graal of Babalon. They have destroyed their earthly ego-identities, becoming nothing more than piles of dust (i.e., the remaining aspects of their True Selves without the self-sense of "I"). It is a step along the path of spiritual purification, and a spiritual resting place for those who have successfully shed their attachments to the mundane world.

The City exists under the Night of Pan, or N.O.X. Pan is both the giver and the taker of life, and his Night is that time of symbolic death where the adept experiences unification with the All through the ecstatic destruction of the ego-self. In a less poetic symbolic sense, this is the state where one transcends all limitations and experiences oneness with the universe.

Magus
(9°=2□): The Magus seeks to attain Wisdom (symbolized by entering Chokmah on the Tree of Life), declares his law, and is a Master of all Magick in its greatest and highest sense. His will is entirely free from internal diversion or external opposition; His work is to create a new Universe in accordance with his Will. This grade corresponds to Chokmah on the Tree of Life. It also bears some resemblance to Nietzsche's "new philosopher" who creates values, although with more focus on self-transcendence according to Crowley biographer Lawrence Sutin. The state of being a Magus is described in Crowley's Liber B vel Magi. Of the Magi, Crowley writes:

Elsewhere, he admits the possibility of someone reaching this rank without uttering a new magick Word. Such a Magus, he says, would identify himself or herself with the Word of the current Aeon and work to establish it. In Magick Without Tears, Crowley suggests (without actually saying so) that the Secret Chiefs of the A∴A∴ have reached at least the rank of Magus, in some sense.

Ipsissimus
(10°=1□): The state of Ipsissimus is the very highest grade possible (symbolized by the sphere of Kether on the Tree of Life), beyond the comprehension of the lower degrees. An Ipsissimus is free from limitations and necessity and lives in perfect balance with the manifest universe. Essentially, the highest mode of attainment. This grade corresponds to Kether on the Tree of Life. Ipsissimus is quite hard to translate directly from Latin to English, but it is essentially the superlative of "self,” translating rather approximately to "His most Selfness," or "self-est." (c.f. generalissimus for the same superlative form in use for a grade from same Latin root.)

Crowley named as a condition of this grade the trance Nirodha-samapatti, which reduces heartbeat and other life functions to the bare minimum. Theravada Buddhist monks traditionally attain nirodha-samapatti by producing the aforementioned Formless States one after the other, and perceiving in each what they call the Three Characteristics of all existence: sorrow or tendency towards sorrow, change or unreliability, and insubstantiality or lack of self.  Crowley and the A∴A∴ however seek to replace this threefold concept of existence with the quest for balance as both a motive for discipline and the means of achieving their end goal. In Liber B vel Magi they urge the Magus seeking further progress to identify the Buddhist Three Characteristics with the opposite states. "Wherein Sorrow is Joy, and Change is Stability, and Selflessness is Self." Crowley's version of nirodha includes "seeing first the truth and then the falsity of the Three Characteristics" according to his published theory.

The Ipsissimus should keep the achievement of this final grade secret, even from the rest of the Order, and continue with the work of the Magus while expressing the nature of an Ipsissimus in word and deed. Crowley writes:

See also
Libri of Aleister Crowley
Magical organization
Secret society

Notes

References

Citations

Works cited

Primary sources

Secondary sources

Sources
 
Free Encyclopedia of Thelema (2005). A∴A∴. Retrieved March 27, 2005.

Further reading

External links
A∴A∴ at the College of Thelema
Astrum Argenteum - website regarding all branches of the A∴A∴ and the Order's history
Outer College of the A∴A∴

Magical organizations
Secret societies in the United Kingdom
Secret societies in the United States
Thelema